The Great January Comet of 1910, formally designated C/1910 A1 and often referred to as the Daylight Comet, was a comet which appeared in January 1910. It was already visible to the naked eye when it was first noticed, and many people independently "discovered" the comet. At its brightest, it outshone the planet Venus, and was possibly the brightest comet of the 20th century.

Discovery
The comet came to solar conjunction about 1 degree from the Sun on 17 December 1909 but was still about 1 AU from the Sun. In January the comet brightened rather suddenly, and was initially visible from the Southern Hemisphere only. A number of individuals claimed "discovery", but the comet is thought to have been first spotted by diamond miners in the Transvaal before dawn on January 12, 1910, by which time it was already a prominent naked-eye object of apparent magnitude −1 with a declination of −29 (i.e. best seen from the Southern Hemisphere).

The first person to study the comet properly was Scottish astronomer Robert T. A. Innes at the Transvaal Observatory in Johannesburg on January 17, after having been alerted two days earlier by the editor of a Johannesburg newspaper.

The comet reached perihelion on January 17 and was at that time visible in daylight with the unaided eye, having a magnitude of –5 due to the forward scattering of light. It came to solar conjunction a second time on 18 January 1910. Following perihelion, it declined in brightness but became a spectacular sight from the Northern Hemisphere in the evening twilight, its noticeably curved tail reaching up to 50 degrees by early February.

Halley's Comet and the Daylight Comet
The year 1910 saw considerable media interest in the predicted return of Halley's Comet, which reached perihelion on April 20. The appearance of the Daylight Comet several months earlier therefore came as something of a surprise, and made an extremely strong impression on an expectant public; when Halley's Comet returned again in 1986, many older people's accounts of having seen it in 1910 clearly referred to the Daylight Comet instead.

Owing to a "telephonic error", the comet was initially reported as being named Drake's Comet, though once the error was realised the press afterwards referred to it as the Daylight Comet or Sunset Comet, as no single individual was credited with its discovery.

Panic
Newspapers in various cities reported people having been scared by the appearance of the comet. The Morning Post of Camden, New Jersey reported that similar scares happened in past years when comets had been seen. In Korea many thought the comet would kill them all off. Some stopped going to work, just ate and drank and waited for the world to end.

See also
List of Solar System objects by greatest aphelion
Great comet

References

External links

Donald Yeomans, "Great Comets in History". (Accessed 5/6/08)
The Great Daylight Comet of 1910, by John W. Bortle, Sky and Telescope

Non-periodic comets
Great January Comet Of 1910
19100112
Great comets